Ilídio Pinto Leandro (14 December 1950 – 21 February 2020) was a Portuguese Roman Catholic bishop.

Pinto Leandro was born in Portugal and was ordained to the priesthood in 1973. He served as bishop of the Roman Catholic Diocese of Viseu from 2006 until 2018.

Notes

1950 births
2020 deaths
21st-century Roman Catholic bishops in Portugal